Elimination Dance is a 1998 Canadian short drama film. Directed by Bruce McDonald, Don McKellar and Michael Ondaatje based on Ondaatje's poem of the same name, the film stars McKellar and Tracy Wright as a couple in a jazz dance competition, in which various couples are eliminated as the announcer (Michael Turner) calls out various elimination criteria drawn from Ondaatje's poem.

Other people appearing in the film as non-speaking dancers include Meryn Cadell, Carole Pope, Laura Bertram, Valerie Buhagiar, Chas Lawther, Anna Stratton, Duke Redbird, Ryan Black, Esta Spalding, Leah Cherniak, James Allodi and Clement Virgo.

The film premiered at the 1998 Toronto International Film Festival.

The film was a Genie Award nominee for Best Live Action Short Drama at the 19th Genie Awards in 1999.

References

External links

1998 films
1998 short films
Canadian drama short films
Canadian dance films
Films directed by Bruce McDonald
Films directed by Don McKellar
Films based on poems
English-language Canadian films
1990s English-language films
1990s Canadian films